The 2010 FC Spartak Moscow season was the club's 19th season in the Russian Premier League season.

Spartak finished the season in 4th place, qualifying for the 2011–12 UEFA Europa League Play-off rounds. After entering the 2010–11 UEFA Champions League at the group stage, Spartak finished third behind Chelsea and Marseille, progressing to the Round of 32 of the 2010–11 UEFA Europa League due to take place during the 2011–12 season. In the 2010–11 Russian Cup, Spartak progressed to the Round of 16, also taking place during the 2011–12 season.

Season events

Squad

On loan

Left club during season

Transfers

In

Loans in

Out

Loans out

Released

Competitions

Premier League

Results by round

Results

League table

Russian Cup

The Round of 16 took place during the 2011–12 season.

UEFA Champions League

Group stage

Squad statistics

Appearances and goals

|-
|colspan="16"|Players away from the club on loan:

|-
|colspan="16"|Players who appeared for Spartak Moscow but left during the season:

|}

Goal scorers

Clean sheets

Disciplinary record

References

FC Spartak Moscow seasons
Spartak Moscow